Stăncuța is a commune located in Brăila County, Muntenia, Romania. It is composed of four villages: Cuza Vodă, Polizești, Stanca and Stăncuța.

The Balta Mică a Brăilei Natural Park is partly situated on the administrative territory of the commune.

References

Communes in Brăila County
Localities in Muntenia